Cindy Hsu is a Chinese American television news reporter and anchor at WCBS-TV in New York City. She currently anchors CBS 2 News at 9am, and she is also fill-in & substitute anchor. At different times, she previously served as anchor for the morning, noon, and 5:00 p.m. newscasts. She previously anchored the weekend evening newscasts solo up until July 2016, when she was replaced by Jessica Moore.

Hsu was born in Honolulu, Hawaii on May 6, 1966. Having joined the station in 1993 as a reporter, Hsu was promoted to weekend co-anchor in May 1994. Hsu was promoted again to morning co-anchor in July 1996, then noon co-anchor in October of that same year.

Prior to joining WCBS-TV, Hsu worked as a reporter and anchor at WFRV-TV in Green Bay, Wisconsin and for WTOV-TV in Steubenville, Ohio. She began her broadcasting career as an associate producer for WTVR-TV in Richmond, Virginia.

See also
 Chinese Americans in New York City
 New Yorkers in journalism

References

External links
 official WCBS-TV bio
WCBS-TV Homepage

1966 births
Living people
Television anchors from New York City
American journalists of Chinese descent
American women television journalists
Hawaii people of Chinese descent
American women journalists of Asian descent
21st-century American women